Polyscias montana, synonym Arthrophyllum montanum, is a species of plant in the family Araliaceae. It is a shrub or tree endemic to Peninsular Malaysia. It is threatened by habitat loss.

References

montana
Endemic flora of Peninsular Malaysia
Trees of Peninsular Malaysia
Conservation dependent plants
Taxonomy articles created by Polbot